ASMR, or autonomous sensory meridian response, is a perceptual phenomenon.
ASMR may also refer to:
 American Society of Mining and Reclamation, a professional society
 Khalid al-Asmr, a citizen of Jordan who was held in the Guantanamo Bay detention camp
"ASMR", a song by 21 Savage on the 2018 album I Am > I Was
 Accelerating seismic moment release, in earthquake prediction
 Age-specific mortality rate or age-standardised mortality rate

See also
 (ASMR) Vin Diesel DMing a Game of D&D Just For You, a 2015 Twine game created by Merritt k